K32OV-D is a low-powered television station owned and operated by HC2 Holdings. The station broadcasts its digital signal on virtual 24 and UHF channel 32, and licensed to Lubbock, Texas.

In June 2013, the then-K24GP was slated to be sold to Landover 5 LLC as part of a larger deal involving 51 other low-power television stations; the sale fell through in June 2016. Mako Communications sold its stations, including K24GP, to HC2 Holdings in 2017.

Digital channels

References

External links

Television stations in Lubbock, Texas
Television channels and stations established in 2005
2005 establishments in Texas
Innovate Corp.
Low-power television stations in the United States